Jussi Ruoho (16 May 1892 – 24 October 1975) was a Finnish athlete. He competed in the men's pole vault at the 1920 Summer Olympics.

References

1892 births
1975 deaths
Athletes (track and field) at the 1920 Summer Olympics
Finnish male pole vaulters
Olympic athletes of Finland
Place of birth missing